Debra Lynn Bowen (born October 27, 1955) is an American attorney and politician who served as the Secretary of State of California from 2007 to 2015. Previously, she was a member of the California State Legislature from 1992 to 2006. In March 2008, she was given the Profile in Courage Award by the John F. Kennedy Presidential Library and Museum.

Background and education
Bowen was born and raised in Rockford, Illinois, where she graduated from Guilford High School in 1973. She received her bachelor's degree in 1976 from Michigan State University, and her Juris Doctor in 1979 from the University of Virginia School of Law. In 1984, she started her own California law firm.

Motivated by the death of Robin Williams a few weeks earlier, in September 2014, her last year serving as Secretary of State, Bowen revealed that she has been battling depression since she had been in college. She vowed to continue to serve out her term as Secretary of State.

Career in politics
Bowen began her career in politics on the Neighborhood Watch and Heal the Bay.  Her first elected office was to the California State Assembly, where she represented the 53rd Assembly District in the South Bay, Los Angeles area from 1992 to 1998. Bowen was first elected to the California State Senate, representing the 28th State Senate District, in 1998. Her district included all or portions of the cities of Carson, El Segundo, Hermosa Beach, Lomita, Los Angeles, Long Beach, Manhattan Beach, Redondo Beach, Torrance, Venice, and Wilmington. Bowen chaired the California Senate's Committee on Elections, Reapportionment and Constitutional Amendments. She also sat on the Energy, Utilities & Communications and Rules committees. Due to term limits, her service in the Senate ended in December 2006.

On June 6, 2006, Bowen faced Deborah Ortiz, another state senator, in the Democratic primary to run against Bruce McPherson for the position of California Secretary of State. Bowen won the primary by a 61-39 margin. On November 2, Bowen defeated Republican candidate McPherson for reelection by a margin of 3%.

She was re-elected on November 2, 2010 over Republican Damon Dunn.

Candidacy for Congress seat

After incumbent Jane Harman announced she was vacating the seat, Bowen was widely discussed as a possible candidate for the 36th congressional district special election to replace her. On February 15, 2011, Bowen announced in an email to her supporters that she was entering the race. Her candidacy was endorsed by former Vermont governor and Democratic National Committee chairman Howard Dean, Democracy for America, the California League of Conservation Voters, and the California Nurses Association. She came in third, not qualifying for the general election for the seat.

Policy interests
Bowen is known for her support of opening government to the Internet. In 1993, her first year in elected office, she helped to pass Assembly Bill (AB) 1624, which made all of California's bill information available on the Internet.

In May 2007, Bowen commissioned a "Top to Bottom Review" of California's electronic voting systems, to determine their security.  On August 3, 2007, Bowen withdrew approval and certification and conditionally re-approved three electronic voting systems (Diebold Election Systems, Hart InterCivic, Sequoia Voting Systems), and rescinded approval of a fourth system, (Election Systems & Software), after the top-to-bottom review of the voting machines found the machines to be highly insecure.  For these efforts she was awarded the Profile in Courage Award by the John F. Kennedy Presidential Library and Museum.

Bowen was interviewed for the January 16, 2008 broadcast of The NewsHour with Jim Lehrer and was the keynote speaker for the 2008 Usenix Security Symposium.

Electoral history

References

External links

AB 1624 Info on CA Legislation site
Why California Secretary of State Debra Bowen Pulled the Plug on E-Voting Government Technology Magazine July 2008

Join California Debra Bown

1955 births
Living people
Politicians from Rockford, Illinois
California lawyers
Democratic Party California state senators
Democratic Party members of the California State Assembly
Michigan State University alumni
People from Los Angeles County, California
Secretaries of State of California
University of Virginia School of Law alumni
Women state legislators in California
American women lawyers
21st-century American politicians
21st-century American women politicians